Anterior interventricular may refer to:

 Anterior interventricular sulcus
 Anterior interventricular branch of left coronary artery